Tick Tack may refer to:

 "Tick Tack" (song), by South Korean boy band U-KISS
 Tick! Tack!, a visual novel by Navel
 Tic Tac, the brand name of small, hard mints manufactured by the Italian confectioner Ferrero
 Tic-tac, a betting signalling system